Sukesh Heera (born 11 December 1998) is an Indian cricketer. He made his Twenty20 debut on 18 January 2021, for Odisha in the 2020–21 Syed Mushtaq Ali Trophy.

References

External links
 

1998 births
Living people
Indian cricketers
Odisha cricketers
Cricketers from Jaipur